Maentwrog power station was built by the North Wales Power Company and supplied electricity to North Wales, Deeside and Cheshire. It exploits the water resources of the Snowdonia mountains, using water turbines to drive electricity alternators. The 24MW station has been owned by several organisations; since 2004 it has been owned by the Nuclear Decommissioning Authority. It generates an annual electricity output of 60.6GWh.

History
Maentwrog hydro-electric power station was first commissioned in October 1928 by the North Wales Power Company Limited. The company also owned Dolgarrog and Cwm Dyli power stations. The new station was financed by the issue of £1.7million of debenture stock in 1924. The architectural design of the power house was by Sir Alexander Gibb and Partners.

To power the station a new reservoir was built at Trawsfynydd, formed by the construction of four dams. The main dam on the Afon Prysor was Britain's first large arch dam. The other three cut off dams were Gyfynys, Hendre Mur and Trawsfynydd. In 1925, members of the North Wales and South Cheshire Joint Electricity Authority visited the dam at Maentwrog, then under construction. They reported that they were "greatly impressed with the magnitude of the work and with the expeditious way in which this great work is being carried out".

Water flows to the power station through a  diameter low pressure pipeline and two tunnels, plus a  diameter high pressure line. The station initially had a capacity of 18MW, but this was increased in 1934 to 24MW by an additional 6MW generator set fed by a  diameter high pressure pipeline.

The operation of the stations was dependant on rainfall. As a result the company's three stations (Maentwrog, Cwm Dyli and Dolgarrog) were able to generate a total of 93,199.950MWh of electricity.

The operation of the Trawsfynydd nuclear power station from 1965 to 1991, using the reservoir for cooling water, restricted the height of water available for hydro-electricity. 

Owners
Maentwrog power station has been owned by the following organisations, through nationalisation, reorganisation and privatisation of the electricity industry.

 North Wales Power Company Limited (1926–1948)
 British Electricity Authority (1948–1955), nationalisation 1948
 Central Electricity Authority (1955–1957)
 Central Electricity Generating Board (1958–1990)
 Nuclear Electric (1990–2004), privatisation 1990
 Nuclear Decommissioning Authority (2004–present).

Maentwrog power station was vested in Nuclear Electric when the British electricity supply industry was privatised in 1990. From 2004, the Nuclear Decommissioning Authority (NDA) assumed ownership although operations are devolved to NDA site licence company Magnox Ltd.

Plant and equipment 
The original generating plant comprised four 6MW Boving-English Electric 6.6kV generating sets. The alternator exciters are directly coupled, 40kW, 110V.

There were English Electric and Ferranti step up transformers, from 6.6kV to 20, 33, and 66kV.

The original plant was removed in 1989-1992 and new plant with a generating capacity of 30MW (two 1MW) was installed.

Operations
Operating data for the period 1935–92 was:

The station output, in MWh, is shown graphically:
The station is operated by Magnox Ltd on behalf of the Nuclear Decommissioning Authority.

See also
 Timeline of the UK electricity supply industry
 List of power stations in Wales
 Hydroelectricity in the United Kingdom

References

External links
Daily electricity generation forecast

Hydroelectric power stations in Wales